Justine Simone Lindsay (born September 19, 1992) is an American dancer, professional cheerleader, and podcaster. In 2022, upon making the Carolina TopCats, the cheerleading team associated with the Carolina Panthers, Lindsay became the first openly transgender person chosen to cheer in the National Football League.

Education 
Lindsay attended Johnson C. Smith University, where she was a member of the Golden Bullettes dance team, and graduated with a bachelor's degree in communications from North Carolina State University. She also earned an associates degree from The Art Institute of Charlotte. In 2012, while an undergraduate student, Lindsay performed in a halftime show with the St. Augustine's University marching band.

Career 
Lindsay hosts a podcast on Spotify called Keeping It Sweet With Justine.

NFL Cheerleading 
In March 2022, Lindsay became the first openly transgender person to make a National Football League Cheerleading team when she joined the Carolina TopCats. While there is no official record of the history of the National Football League's cheerleading rosters, and therefore it is possible that transgender women could have been on teams before, Lindsay is the first transgender woman on a team to be open about her identity. After making the team, Lindsay revealed she was transgender via a post on her Instagram. In June 2022, the news that Lindsay was the first transgender cheerleader in the National Football League became public after an article was posted about her on BuzzFeed. BuzzFeed had found her post about making the Carolina TopCats, and coming out as a transgender woman, on Instagram. She also was selected with a bald head, and stated that she hoped to inspire other young people who might feel insecure about their bald look and break down barriers about gender and appearance, stating:I'm happy because I was able to break down that door and tell people, "Hey, we are not just sexual beings ... We are actual human beings who want to better ourselves." I felt like, Why not tell the world: "Hey, listen, this is a great accomplishment."

After facing some backlash due to Lindsay's hiring, the Panthers made the following official statement to the National Public Radio: "Members of the TopCats are hired based on their qualifications and abilities. Our organization is an equal opportunity employer and does not discriminate because of age, race, religion, color, disability, sex, sexual orientation, or national origin. We wish all the TopCats, including Justine Lindsay, an incredible season."

References 

Living people
1992 births
21st-century African-American women
21st-century American dancers
African-American female dancers
American cheerleaders
American women podcasters
American podcasters
Carolina Panthers personnel
Dancers from North Carolina
Johnson C. Smith Golden Bulls and Lady Golden Bulls
LGBT African Americans
American LGBT entertainers
LGBT people from North Carolina
National Football League cheerleaders
North Carolina State University alumni
Transgender dancers
Transgender entertainers
Transgender women